Medesano is a comune (municipality) in the Province of Parma in the Italian region Emilia-Romagna, located about  northwest of Bologna and about  southwest of Parma.

The municipality of Medesano contains the frazioni (subdivisions, mainly villages and hamlets) Arduini, Ca'Bernini, Ca'Dordone, Ca'Rettori, Casa di Cura, Case Caselli, Case Faggi, Casa Matteo, Cavicchiolo, Divisione Julia, Felegara, Ferrari, Il Novellino, La Carnevala, Mezzadri, Pianezza, Ramiola, Roccalanzona, Sant'Andrea Bagni, Troilo, and Varano Marchesi.

Medesano borders the following municipalities: Collecchio, Fidenza, Fornovo di Taro, Noceto, Pellegrino Parmense, Salsomaggiore Terme, Varano de' Melegari.

Demographic evolution

References

External links
 www.comune.medesano.pr.it

Cities and towns in Emilia-Romagna